Justice Moss may refer to:

Joseph Rodney Moss (1903–1993), associate justice and Chief Justice on the South Carolina Supreme Court
William W. Moss (1872–1949), associate justice of the Rhode Island Supreme Court